Gradius is a video game series created by Japanese game designer Machiguchi Hiroyasu and published by Konami. The series debuted in arcades with Gradius in March 1985, renamed Nemesis for international versions. Games in the series have been released for several platforms, including arcade hardware, home video game consoles, handheld systems and mobile phones. The Gradius franchise consists of 16 games, including spin-offs, home conversions and compilations, as well as other forms of media such as toys, manga, soundtrack albums and literature. The series has been seen by critics as important and influential for the shoot'em up genre, inspiring games such as R-Type, Thunder Force and Darius, as well as setting the template for horizontal-scrolling shooters as a whole. It is Konami's most successful shooter series and one of the company's core franchises.

Gameplay in the series remains relatively consistent throughout each installment: players assume the role of a starship called the Vic Viper in its efforts to vanquish the Bacterian army before they destroy the planet Gradius. Being a horizontal-scrolling shooter, the player must destroy enemies and avoid both them and their projectiles. Some enemies leave behind power capsules when destroyed, which can be used to select one of seven different weapons on the player's "power meter", and collecting more of them will give access to stronger, more durable weapons. Common elements throughout the series include enemy "Moai" statues, additional playable ships, and boss rush segments.

Video games

Spin-offs

Compilations and collections
The Gradius games have spawned a number of sequels. Being a prominent series in the shoot 'em up genre, the titles have become classics and thus have been repackaged and rebundled in several versions. These releases contain extra features and bonuses such as enhanced artwork, expanded soundtracks, and story materials.

Gokujō Parodius Da! Deluxe Pack
1994 — PlayStation, Sega Saturn
 Compilation of the arcade releases of Parodius Da! and Fantastic Parodius.
 Never released in North America.

Gradius Deluxe Pack
1996 — PlayStation, Sega Saturn, Windows
 Compilation of Gradius and Gradius II.
 Includes an introductory sequence created using Computer-generated imagery.
 Never released in North America or Europe.

Salamander Deluxe Pack Plus
1997 — PlayStation, Sega Saturn
 Compilation of the arcade releases of Salamander, Life Force and Salamander 2.
 Includes an introductory CGI sequence.
 Never released in North America or Europe.

Konami GB Collection
1997,2000 — Game Boy, Game Boy Color
 ?.
 Never released in North America.

Gradius III and IV
2000 — PlayStation 2
 Compilation of Gradius III and Gradius IV.
 Includes an introductory CGI sequence.
 Released in Japan with the subtitle ~Fukkatsu no Shinwa~ (lit. "Myth of Revival").

Gradius Collection
2006 — PlayStation Portable
 Compilation of Gradius, Gradius II, Gradius III, Gradius IV and Gradius Gaiden.
 Released as Gradius Portable in Japan.
 Includes music and movie galleries with content from previous console releases.

Parodius Portable
2007 — PlayStation Portable
 Compilation of Parodius, Parodius Da!, Fantastic Parodius, Jikkyō Oshaberi Parodius and Sexy Parodius.

Salamander Portable
2007 — PlayStation Portable
 Compilation of the arcade releases of Salamander, Life Force, Salamander 2, Nemesis 2 and Xexex.

Merchandise
 Gradius Board Game
 Parodius Plush, Grape, Purple, Blue and Pirate Penguin
 Parodius Da! Pencil Board by Shitajiki
 Gradius Portable Cleaner
 Otomedius Pillow
 Paro Wars the Board Game (1998)
 MSX Salamander (Keychain)
 Gokujo Parodius (Mini-Notebook and Keychain Issue) from Gacha
 Gokujo Parodius (Cards) from Card Jan
 
 Otomedius Cellphone
 Otomedius Pin Aoba Anoa
 Gradius Pins
 Otomedius Big Doll
 Otomedius Keyrings
 Otomedius Action Figure

Video collections

Printed media

Music albums

References

Gradius
Media
Gradius